AirQuarius Aviation was an airline based in Johannesburg, South Africa, operating chartered flights and aircraft leasing contracted by companies throughout Africa and the Middle East. The airline's base was at Lanseria Airport, Johannesburg.

History
AirQuarius Aviation (Pty) Ltd was established by Gavin Branson in 1997 and started operations in 2001, doing  business as AirQuarius Air Charter. The name was changed to Branson Air (Pty) Ltd, doing business as AirQuarius in 2007. At one time, it had 120 employees. The airline specialized in operating flights to political crisis areas. As such, AirQuarius was the only operator into Baghdad or Basra during the Iraq War. Other missions included UN flights into Afghanistan and Sudan.

In 2011, it was alleged that an air operating certificate was awarded to an  AirQuarius Charters aircraft on the basis of an inspection form which the inspector said was not written or signed by him.

AirQuarius stopped operating on 7 February 2012.

Fleet
AirQuarius operated Fokker 28, Fokker 100, Hawker Siddeley HS 748 and Boeing 737-200 aircraft.

References

Defunct airlines of South Africa
Airlines established in 1997
Airlines disestablished in 2012
Companies based in Johannesburg
2012 disestablishments in South Africa
South African companies established in 1997